The Thing About Vince... is a 2000 British made-for-television three-episode comedy-drama mini-series directed by Christopher King and starring Timothy Spall and Sheila Hancock.

Plot
Vince, a self-employed builder from London, is a middle-aged man, too old to flirt and too young to retire. He makes a big mistake when during a tropical fish fanciers' weekend, he remains up all night while chatting with a young attractive woman.

Cast
3 episodes
 Timothy Spall as Vince
 Sheila Hancock as Pat
 Peter Vaughan as Ray
 Kellie Bright as Sally
 Jamie Glover as Paul
 Marion Bailey as Wendy
 Bob Mason as John
 Chris Gascoyne as Monk
 Perry Blanks as Robin
 2 episodes
 Jeremy Swift as Dr Venn
 Amanda Abbington as Lisa
 Jeillo Edwards as Mrs Cuffy
1 episode
 Jordan Long as TV shop assistant
 Bradley Walsh as Perry
 Richard Graham as Bradshaw
 Bruce Alexander as Edward Turton
 Fiona Allen as Zoe
 Deborah Grant as Anthea Turton
 Richard Heffer as Mr Rigby

References

External links

2000 British television series debuts
2000 British television series endings
2000s British comedy-drama television series
ITV comedy-dramas
ITV miniseries
Carlton Television
Television series by ITV Studios
English-language television shows
Television shows set in London